Georges Krotoff (13 July 1906 – 6 August 1987) was a French sprinter. He competed in the men's 400 metres at the 1928 Summer Olympics.

References

1906 births
1987 deaths
Athletes (track and field) at the 1928 Summer Olympics
French male sprinters
Olympic athletes of France
Place of birth missing
20th-century French people